An Jae-song (born 3 May 1934) is a South Korean former sports shooter. He competed at the 1960, 1964 and 1968 Summer Olympics and 1966 Asian Games.

References

1934 births
Living people
South Korean male sport shooters
Olympic shooters of South Korea
Shooters at the 1960 Summer Olympics
Shooters at the 1964 Summer Olympics
Shooters at the 1968 Summer Olympics
Asian Games medalists in shooting
Shooters at the 1966 Asian Games
South Korean military personnel
People from South Pyongan
Asian Games gold medalists for South Korea
Medalists at the 1966 Asian Games
20th-century South Korean people
21st-century South Korean people